First written and produced by Peter Tosh in 1978. "Soon Come" is also the name of a Brooklyn-based reggae dub artist. The title is also used for a completely different song by English record producer Shy FX, featuring vocals from English singer Liam Bailey. It was released on 29 July 2013 through his record label Digital Soundboy. It entered the UK Singles Chart at number 55.

Music video
The music video for the song was released onto the Digital Soundboy YouTube channel on 28 July 2013 and lasts a total length of three minutes and five seconds.

Track listing

Chart performance

Weekly charts

References

1978 songs
2013 singles
Shy FX songs
Reggae songs